The 2007 Arab Youth Volleyball Championship was held in Latakia, Syria from 16 August to 24 August, 2007.

Teams

 (B Team)

Pools composition

Pool A

|}

|}

Pool B

|}

|}

Final round

Classification 5–10 places

Ninth place match

|}

Seventh place match

|}

Fifth place match

|}

Championship bracket

Semifinals

|}

Bronze medal match

|}

Final

|}

Final standing

Awards
MVP:  Hamza Nagga
Best Spiker:  Ali Marhoun
Best Blocker:  Sultan Ahmed
Best Server:  Ali Sirafi
Best Setter:  Soleyman Abdelfateh
Best Receiver:  Mosleh Alomar
Best Digger:  Safouen Mohammed Ali
Best Looking:  Roni Marwan Aloe

References

External links
 syria-news.com 
 abdogedeon.com 
 alwasatnews.com 

Arab Youth Volleyball Championship
Arab Youth Volleyball Championship
Sport in Latakia
2007 in Syrian sport
International sports competitions hosted by Syria